Goodenia fasciculata is a species of flowering plant in the family Goodeniaceae and is endemic to the south-west of Western Australia. It an ascending shrub with bunched, narrow linear stem leaves and spikes of white flowers.

Description

Taxonomy and naming
This species was first formally described in 1837 by George Bentham who gave it the name Scaevola fasciculata in Stephan Endlicher's Enumeratio plantarum quas in Novae Hollandiae ora austro-occidentali ad fluvium Cygnorum et in sinu Regis Georgii collegit Carolus Liber Baro de Hügel from material collected near the Swan River by Charles von Hügel. In 1990 Roger Charles Carolin changed the name to Goodenia fasciculata in the journal Telopea.

Distribution and habitat
This goodenia grows in gravelly or sandy soil on granite outcrops and ridges of laterite on and near the Darling Range in the Avon Wheatbelt, Geraldton Sandplains, Jarrah Forest and Swan Coastal Plain biogeographic regions of Western Australia.

Conservation status
Goodenia fasciculata is classified as "not threatened" by the Government of Western Australia Department of Parks and Wildlife.

References

fasciculata
Eudicots of Western Australia
Plants described in 1837
Taxa named by George Bentham
Endemic flora of Western Australia